The F&F Tower (previously known as the Revolution Tower and locally nicknamed the Corkscrew or the Screw) is an office tower in Panama City, Panama designed by Pinzon Lozano & Asociados Arquitectos.

Key data 

Total height: 242.9 metres (796 feet)
Total space - 60,753 m². 
Condition: Finalised.
Position: 
In Panama: 2012: 9th place 
In Latin America: 2012: 14th place 
Materials: glass, reinforced concrete

Gallery

See also
 List of tallest buildings in Panama City
 List of twisted buildings

References

External links

Skyscrapers in Panama City
Twisted buildings and structures
Skyscraper office buildings
Office buildings completed in 2011